General Jacob van Wassenaer Obdam (25 August 1645 – 24 May 1714) was a Dutch general in the War of the Spanish Succession. 

He was born in Heusden, the son of the famous Dutch Admiral Jacob van Wassenaer Obdam. On 19 May 1676 at Delden he married Adriana Sophia van Raesfelt. Their son was composer and diplomat Unico Wilhelm van Wassenaer.

Unlike his father, he chose career in the army, rather than the navy. In 1702 he led the siege of Venlo, not completely to the satisfaction of Marlborough, his superior.

In 1703 his army of 10 000 men was surrounded by 40 000 French at Ekeren. Considering all hope for a breakthrough lost, Obdam abandoned his army and escaped with 30 men, disguising themselves as Frenchmen. When he arrived in the Netherlands he wrote a letter admitting the total destruction of his army. But the army, now under General Slangenburg, had forced an escape route late in the evening and saved itself. The struggle was known as the Battle of Ekeren.

Obdam's behavior wasn't forgiven and his military career was finished. He was appointed Governor of 's-Hertogenbosch and became Ambassador to the Elector Palatine between 1708 and 1712. He died in The Hague in 1714.

Notes

1645 births
1714 deaths
Dutch army commanders in the War of the Spanish Succession
Dutch generals
Dutch nobility
People from Heusden
18th-century Dutch military personnel